The Yazd Tower of Silence (Persian: برج خاموشان یزد) or the Yazd Dakhma (Persian: دخمه یزد) is a Zoroastrian tower of silence located 15 kilometers to the south east of the city of Yazd, Iran.

History 
Zoroastrians believe that earth, fire and water are all holy elements, and thus do not pollute them by burying, burning or giving their dead to the water. Instead, they place their dead bodies on in a tower of silence, letting vultures to consume the corpses. In the middle of the tower exists a pit known as Ostudan (Persian: استودان) where the remaining bones are placed after they are stripped of meat.

This practice, however, has been banned in Iran since 1966-1967, and ever since no body has been placed in this tower of silence.

It is included in the list of national heritage sites of Iran with the number 6312.

References 

Zoroastrianism in Iran
National works of Iran
Tourist attractions in Yazd Province
Buildings and structures in Yazd Province